Harve is a masculine given name. Notable people with the name include:

Harve Bennett (1930–2015), American television and film producer and screenwriter
Harve Brosten (born 1943), American screenwriter
Harve A. Oliphant (1912–1998), American football coach
Harve Pierre, American musician
Harve Presnell (1933–2009), American actor and singer
Harve Tibbott (1885–1969), American politician

Masculine given names